Lisa Hammer (née Houle; born April 4, 1967 in Salem, Massachusetts, U.S.) is an American filmmaker, actress, composer and singer and is the sister of director James Merendino (SLC Punk!). She graduated from Emerson College, with a BS in Film. She founded the Blessed Elysium Motion Picture Company, which produces German Expressionist films. Such works include Pus$bucket and Crawley, a collaboration with Ben Edlund and Doc Hammer, her ex-husband. She has also contributed to Joanie4Jackie, a film anthology project run by Miranda July, which featured Hammer's film Empire of Ache starring Dame Darcy.

Hammer collaborated with Dame Darcy on the weekly television show Turn of the Century, a New York City Public-access television cable TV show done in a German Expressionist manner that lasted from 1996 to 1999. The show featured various New York personalities, including Daria Klotz (as Duchess Daria), Jennifer Nixon as Queen Itchie, Bliss Blood, Maude Swift as Secretary Jenny and guests such as Thurston Moore and Courtney Love. It was cited by New York Magazine as "the best public access show of 1997" and has been syndicated on public access stations around the U.S. She collaborated with cult star Alizarinkryz on the weekly NYC cable show POX from 2002-2004. POX was cited by New York Press Magazine as "the best public access show of 2003", and has also been syndicated on public access stations around the U.S. and on the internet.

Hammer directed the feature film version of POX, which stars (alphabetically) Aarti Mann (credited as Aarti Majmudar¹), Lisa D'Amato, Clint Catalyst, Clayne Crawford, James Duval, and Jeff Lieberman, among others. It was released on April 4, 2011.

She was also lead singer of the goth band Mors Syphilitica from 1995 through 2002. The band released three full-length recordings and one 12 inch EP before breaking up. She was also the lead singer of the band Requiem in White releasing several recordings and videos.

In 2003, Lisa joined the cast of The Venture Bros. as the voice of Triana Orpheus.

In 2009, she released her first solo album, Dakini on Projekt Records.

In 2012 she teamed up with Steven Deal to form Radiana. Their
self-titled debut album came out on Projekt Records the same year.

Films
 The Invisible Life of Thomas Lynch by Lisa Hammer and James Merendino
 POX by Lisa Hammer
 Pus$bucket by Lisa Hammer
 Crawley by Lisa Hammer, Ben Edlund and Doc Hammer
 Period Piece by Lisa Hammer
 Why Does it Do That? by Lisa Hammer
 Ultimate Team Invasion Force by Lisa Hammer
 Grimmer Than Grimm stageplay by Lisa Hammer
 Empire of Ache by Lisa Hammer
 The Dance of Death by Lisa Hammer
 Cards With Cards by Lisa Hammer and Dame Darcy
 Turn of the Century by Lisa Hammer
 Jorinda and Joringel by Lisa Hammer
 Beauty and the Beast by Lisa Hammer
 Rub by Doc Hammer starring Lisa Hammer
 Maldorora and a Little Girl by Maude Swift starring Lisa Hammer

Discography
Requiem in White:
 12 inch vinyl EP, First Communion
 "Of The Want Infinite", CD, First Communion

Mors Syphilitica:
 12 inch vinyl EP, Sacrum Torch, 1996
 Mors Syphilitica,  CD, Sacrum Torch, 1996
 Primrose, CD, Sacrum Torch, 1998
 Feather and Fate, CD, Projekt, 2001

Solo
 Dakini, CD, Projekt, 2009

Radiana
 Radiana, CD, Projekt, 2012

References

External links
 
 
 Insound.com Profile of Lisa Hammer

American women singers
Emerson College alumni
People from Salem, Massachusetts
1967 births
Living people
Singers from Massachusetts
Film directors from Massachusetts
21st-century American women

pt:Mors Syphilitica